The Armored Medical Research Laboratory (AMRL) was a U.S. Army medical research facility maintained at Fort Knox, Kentucky from 1942 to 1961 to solve environmental problems encountered by soldiers in tanks.

Mission
Ultimately, the mission of the AMRL was expanded to include research on heat acclimation, physical fitness, nutrition, burns and foot disabilities as applied to soldiers.

Merge
Finally, elements of the AMRL merged with the Environmental Protection Research Division (EPRD) of the U.S. Army's Quartermaster Research and Engineering Command in 1961 to constitute what is now the United States Army Research Institute of Environmental Medicine (USARIEM) at Natick, MA.

References

See also
List of former United States Army medical units

Closed installations of the United States Army
Closed research facilities of the United States Army
Closed medical research facilities of the United States Army
1942 establishments in Kentucky
1961 disestablishments in Kentucky